Jaroslav Černý may refer to:

 Jaroslav Černý (footballer) (born 1979), Czech footballer
 Jaroslav Černý (painter) (1904–1984), Czech painter
 Jaroslav Černý (Egyptologist) (1898–1970), Czech Egyptologist